The 1931 San Francisco State Golden Gaters football team represented San Francisco State Teachers College—now known as San Francisco State University—as an independent during the 1931 college football season. This was the first season for football at San Francisco State. Led by first-year head coach Dave Cox, San Francisco State compiled a record of 2–3–3 and outscored its opponents 50 to 35. The team played home games at Ewing Field in San Francisco. Although the "Gator" was voted to be the mascot for the team in 1931, local newspaper articles called the team the "Golden Gaters".

Schedule

References

San Francisco State
San Francisco State Gators football seasons
San Francisco State Golden Gaters football